The George W. Guthrie School is an historic high school building which is located in Wilkes-Barre, Luzerne County, Pennsylvania.

It was added to the National Register of Historic Places in 1980.

History and architectural features
 Built between 1914 and 1915, the George W. Guthrie School is a four-story, steel frame and reinforced concrete building faced with brick, with stone and terra cotta trim.

It measures 136 feet wide and 109 feet deep. The school was named for George W. Guthrie, who served as the superintendent of the Wilkes-Barre schools until 1913.

It was added to the National Register of Historic Places in 1980.

References

Buildings and structures in Wilkes-Barre, Pennsylvania
School buildings on the National Register of Historic Places in Pennsylvania
School buildings completed in 1915
Schools in Luzerne County, Pennsylvania
National Register of Historic Places in Luzerne County, Pennsylvania
1915 establishments in Pennsylvania